The Starling is a 2021 American fantasy comedy-drama film directed by Theodore Melfi and written by Matt Harris. The film stars Melissa McCarthy, Chris O'Dowd, Timothy Olyphant, Kim Quinn, Skyler Gisondo, Loretta Devine, Ravi Kapoor, Daveed Diggs, Rosalind Chao, Laura Harrier, and Kevin Kline.

The Starling premiered at the 2021 Toronto International Film Festival on September 12, 2021, and had a limited release on September 17, 2021, prior to streaming on Netflix on September 24, 2021. It received unfavorable reviews from critics.

Plot
A married couple, the Maynards, suffer after the death of their baby daughter from SIDS. The husband, Jack (Chris O’Dowd), is in a residential mental hospital while his wife Lilly (Melissa McCarthy) remains at home, facing her loss alone.

Lilly is trying to hold it together for Jack's return from the facility. Employed at a grocery store, she works to maintain her family's property. As if Lilly's troubles weren't bad enough, a starling nesting in a tree in her backyard begins to harass and attack her, and she becomes obsessed with stopping it. She's also driving two hours every week to see Jack, wondering if he really wants to come home, and what life would be like if he did.

Prioritizing Jack's grief without managing her own, a counselor at Jack's hospital suggests Lilly see someone for her own mental health before Jack's release. This leads Lilly to the office of Larry Fine (Kevin Kline), a quirky psychiatrist-turned-veterinarian. They form a unique and unlikely bond as they help each other acknowledge and confront their problems. He helps her with the starling whilst embedding ways to help her grieve into their conversations. Lilly begins to become attached to the bird, and when she accidentally hits it with a stone and nearly kills it, she turns to Larry to help her revive the bird.

When the bird recovers, Lilly lets it go. She and the bird start to tolerate each other instead of abusing one another.

Jack returns home and they reconcile and work on their relationship, facing the world together. The film ends with them gardening watched by the starling, who still spends time in their yard.

Cast

Production
The Starling was on the 2005 "Black List" of most-liked unproduced screenplays. In March 2017, it was reported that Dome Karukoski was attached to direct the film, with Keanu Reeves and Isla Fisher in negotiations to star.

In June 2019, it was announced that Melissa McCarthy and Chris O'Dowd would star in the film, with Theodore Melfi directing. The three previously worked together on St. Vincent (2014). In August 2019, Kevin Kline, Timothy Olyphant, Daveed Diggs, Skyler Gisondo, Loretta Devine, Laura Harrier, Rosalind Chao, and Kimberly Quinn joined the cast.

Principal photography began in New York City on August 2, 2019 and wrapped on September 19.

Reception

On the review aggregator website Rotten Tomatoes, the film holds an approval rating of 19% based on 90 reviews, with an average rating of 4.20/10. The website's critical consensus reads, "Burying its talented cast and worthy themes under mounds of heavy-handed melodrama, The Starling is a turkey." Metacritic gave the film a weighted average score of 31 out of 100 based on 23 critics, indicating "generally unfavorable reviews".

Peter Bradshaw of The Guardian gave the film a score of 1/5 stars, writing that the film "is so staggeringly peculiar and bad that it almost has some value as a kind of Dadaist event, a synthesis of non-meaning, a randomly generated heart-warmer movie that has come chuntering out of the printer as a result of an experimental computer program." Clarisse Loughrey of The Independent also gave the film a score of 1/5 stars, describing it as "an utterly bizarre, tonal misfire that fumbles through several ideas before implying that it's perfectly OK to berate the suicidal for being so suicidal", and wrote: "Not only are the jokes in Matt Harris's script badly timed, but they're also largely incomprehensible – there's an extended bit about a leg-humping dog and several caricatures of the mentally ill that all feel like half-remembered approximations of Oscar bait." Johanna Schneller of The Globe and Mail gave the film a score of 1.5/4 stars, writing: "Director Theodore Melfi, who did a fine job with Hidden Figures, focuses his energies here on leaden metaphors, especially a persistent CGI starling, which represents … no one cares what." Caryn James of The Hollywood Reporter described the film as being "so slushily sentimental it makes the typical tearjerker look like a noir."

Kevin Maher of The Times was more positive in his review of the film, giving it a score of 4/5 stars and writing: "The enjoyment of watching this modest melodrama is implicitly connected to a giddy acknowledgement that there remains a bold class of film-maker willing to blow $20 million on a low-key tale of grief for grown-ups." Adam Graham of The Detroit News gave the film a grade of B, writing that it "handles grief in a mature way that is relatable for adult viewers in the mood for a small film about human issues", and concluded that the film "isn't exactly subtle … but there is warmth and truth in its performances, particularly McCarthy and O'Dowd."

References

External links

2021 films
2021 comedy-drama films
American comedy-drama films
Films about birds
Films about grieving
Films directed by Theodore Melfi
Films scored by Benjamin Wallfisch
Films shot in New York City
Entertainment One films
English-language Netflix original films
2020s English-language films
2020s American films